Bill Beath (12 November 1921 – 22 November 1987) was an Australian cricketer. He played seven first-class matches for New South Wales between 1946/47 and 1947/48.

See also
 List of New South Wales representative cricketers

References

External links
 

1921 births
1987 deaths
Australian cricketers
New South Wales cricketers
People from the Central West (New South Wales)
Cricketers from New South Wales